San Francisco Rush: Extreme Racing is a video game developed and published by Atari Games. This game was first released in arcades in 1996 and was ported to Nintendo 64 in 1997 and the PlayStation in 1998. San Francisco Rush: Extreme Racing is the first game in the Rush series.

Development
San Francisco Rush was built around the 3dfx Voodoo Graphics dual chips. The 3dfx hardware was cheaper to develop for than proprietary systems, and Atari used the savings to sell the game at a lower price to arcade operators. It was unveiled at the 1996 Amusement & Music Operators Association (AMOA) show. After originally looking at maps of San Francisco, knowing that the cars would be going 150–160 mph, they realized that they would instead have to craft an alternate version of the city that was more 'fun'.

The new tracks included in The Rock: Alcatraz Edition were actually designed for the Nintendo 64 version of the game, with the sole exception of the Alcatraz track.

Release

Arcade
Released in 1996, the original San Francisco Rush: Extreme Racing features three tracks that take place in San Francisco, California, and eight playable vehicles. San Francisco Rush: Extreme Racing is the first game to use Atari Games' Flagstaff engine.

Released in 1997, San Francisco Rush: The Rock was a ROM update for the original game, allowing arcade owners to extend the life of the original cabinet. The update brought four tracks, including the Alcatraz track, and four new cars. The arcade cabinet is seen in one clip in the music video for Len's "Steal My Sunshine" (1999).

Released in 1998, San Francisco Rush: The Rock: Wave Net is the third and final installment of San Francisco Rush. It's an updated version of The Rock with support for online multiplayer.

Nintendo 64
Rush was ported to the Nintendo 64 in 1997. This conversion contains six tracks, with two of them containing secret stunt courses, plus one hidden track from both San Francisco Rush: Extreme Racing and San Francisco Rush The Rock: Alcatraz Edition. The regular tracks can be run in either reverse or mirrored modes and feature added collectible hidden keys throughout the track that can be used to unlock hidden vehicles. Most of the original cars appeared in this conversion, but some from San Francisco Rush The Rock: Alcatraz Edition are not present. This conversion contains a Practice Mode and a Death Race mode where all cars that crash during a race remain on the track in a wreck, thereby ending the game if the player crashes. The Nintendo 64 port of Rush also includes a Circuit Mode and a save system for Fast Times, circuit progress, and hidden keys that the player can find on secret spots to unlock new cars.

San Francisco Rush The Rock: Alcatraz Edition was presumed to be ported to the Nintendo 64 for release in 1998, but advertisements included in the box of the Nintendo 64 version stating the game was "Coming Fall 1998 for Nintendo 64" were later reported to be in error. The advert was actually intended solely for the arcade version, which includes all of the tracks that were already in the Nintendo 64 version.

Sony PlayStation
Rush was ported to Sony PlayStation in 1998. This conversion contains three tracks, plus an exclusive bonus track. None of the original music from the arcade versions is present, and the announcer voice has been modified, but some of his voiceover is included in the game. Some of the modes from the Nintendo 64 port are included. The Death Race mode was renamed Extreme Race, and circuit mode was included but with fewer tracks. There are two exclusive modes: the GP Mode where the player plays ten races to earn points depending on where he/she finished, and the Explosive Mode which is a single race where the player's car will go ablaze and end the game if it goes under 60 mph. The PlayStation version has all eight original cars but none of the San Francisco Rush The Rock: Alcatraz Edition cars. The gameplay is also different from the arcade version, as the gravity is higher than the arcade version, reducing the jump airtime, and the steering sensitivity was also modified.

Other ports
San Francisco Rush The Rock: Alcatraz Edition was released on PC exclusively with the Quantum3D Raven video card, and was designed to run only on that specific card. It can, however, run on more modern video cards through the use of modified  and a glide wrapper for glide support. It is a near-perfect conversion of the arcade game, although it suffers from several collision detection issues and other bugs.

San Francisco Rush was planned to be ported to the Game Boy Color, but the project was cancelled.. A prototype was discovered and released in January 2022.

San Francisco Rush The Rock: Alcatraz Edition was ported to Midway Arcade Treasures 3 in 2005 for the GameCube, PlayStation 2, and Xbox and a similar version is also included in Midway Arcade Treasures Deluxe Edition for the PC. The Arcade Treasures version is a recreation of the original game, with a new physics engine and sound changes: The game's audio was replaced entirely with a new announcer voice, uses remixed or altered music tracks, and has completely different sound effects. This version received heavy criticism by fans for the alterations made to the audio along with the new physics engine that was reported to be buggy and therefore would mess up the gravity in the game. The PC version had a critical bug where the car would go over 200 mph and then blow up if gas was held on without braking.

Reception

San Francisco Rush was a major hit in arcades, and was cited as a comeback title restoring Atari Games' fortunes as an arcade game developer.

Next Generation reviewed the arcade version of the game, rating it four stars out of five, and stated that "what's coolest about this game are the shortcuts: into sewers, off broken-down freeways, onto skyscraper rooftops, and other unexpected places. Camouflaged in the urban settings of San Francisco, these shortcuts can cut players far ahead of opponents, or if they blow it and crash, a shortcut can set them back to the end of the pack. Either way, it adds a thrill of discovery not usually found in driving games and makes the risk well worth it."

Reviews for the Nintendo 64 port ranged from mixed to laudatory. For example, while Electronic Gaming Monthlys Kraig Kujawa called it "a nice-looking racer with major problems", co-reviewer Kelly Rickards described it as "fun to play and a solid addition to the Nintendo 64's already large library of racers", and Next Generation concluded that "SF Rush is just short of brilliant. It's a fun, challenging game that keeps you playing over and over again." Critics widely applauded the game's numerous hidden shortcuts, exhilarating and unrealistically high jumps, and inclusion of a multiplayer mode with a solid frame rate. GamePro remarked, "Never mind your heart - the death-defying leaps will make you leave your stomach in San Francisco."

The Nintendo 64 version's controls were more controversial. Next Generation and IGN both praised them as tight and balanced, but other critics experienced problems. GamePro, which gave the game a 4.5 out of 5 for fun factor and graphics but a 3.0 for control, said "The analog stick just isn't responsive, and there's no way to power slide." John Ricciardi and Crispin Boyer of Electronic Gaming Monthly both found the brakes so ineffectual that they had to put the car in reverse to handle turns, while Rickards said the control takes getting used to but ultimately works. The game's soundtrack was widely derided as the worst part of the game, though Next Generation deemed it enjoyable, and some critics found that a few of the tunes are so strident that they add a humorous camp value to the game.

Critics almost unanimously said the Nintendo 64 port satisfactorily emulated the arcade version, and praised the added console-exclusive content. However, GameSpot concluded that while the port was as faithful as it could be given the limitations of consumer hardware, it could not fully recreate the feel that sitting in the arcade cabinet gave. By contrast, IGN opined that "Because of all [its] new options and modes, SF Rush for Nintendo 64 feels like a whole new game -- a much better game designed for the home." The reviewer particularly noted how the additional secrets and the removal of the need to insert quarters more strongly encourages the player to explore.

Reviewing the PlayStation version, French magazine Player One praised the better steering when it comes to sharp turns, but criticized the graphics. Spanish magazine PlanetStation praised the jumps, speed, music, and multiple game modes, but criticized the graphics that are inconsistent with the framerate, and the minimal distinction between the playable cars.

Sequels
The San Francisco Rush series was followed by three sequels. The first was Rush 2: Extreme Racing USA, released in 1998 exclusively on Nintendo 64. The second was the futuristic San Francisco Rush 2049 which was released in 1999 for the arcade and ported to the Dreamcast and Nintendo 64 in 2000. The third and final one was L.A. Rush released in 2005.

References

External links

San Francisco Rush: Extreme Racing at Arcade History
San Francisco Rush: Extreme Racing (N64) at GameRankings
San Francisco Rush: Extreme Racing (PS1) at GameRankings

1996 video games
Arcade video games
Atari arcade games
Cancelled Game Boy Color games
Ed Logg games
Midway video games
Multiplayer and single-player video games
Nintendo 64 games
PlayStation (console) games
Racing video games
Racing video games set in the United States
Video games developed in the United States
Video games scored by Matthew Simmonds
Video games set in San Francisco
Windows games